Seyed Ali Eftekhari (born Jan 12, 1964 in Rasht, Iran) is a former Iranian footballer.

References

1964 births
Living people
Iranian footballers
Esteghlal F.C. players
1988 AFC Asian Cup players
Asian Games gold medalists for Iran
Asian Games medalists in football
Footballers at the 1990 Asian Games
Footballers at the 1994 Asian Games
People from Rasht
Medalists at the 1990 Asian Games
Association football midfielders
Sportspeople from Gilan province
20th-century Iranian people